Orlando Sergio Gomes Rodrigues (born 21 October 1969) is a Portuguese former cyclist. He rode in 14 Grand Tours.

Career achievements

Major results

1989
 1st Stage 4b Volta ao Algarve
 4th Overall Volta ao Alentejo
1991
 2nd Overall Volta a Portugal
1st Stages 14 & 16
 2nd Overall GP Costa Azul
 4th Overall Volta ao Algarve
1992
 2nd Tour du Vaucluse
1993
 1st Stage 4 Grande Prémio Jornal de Notícias
1994
 1st  Road race, National Road Championships
 1st  Overall Volta a Portugal
1st Stage 3
 1st Circuito de Getxo
 2nd Overall Troféu Joaquim Agostinho
1995
 1st  Overall Volta a Portugal
1st Stage 5
 1st  Overall Troféu Joaquim Agostinho
1996
 3rd Road race, National Road Championships
1997
 1st Stage 1 GP Mosqueteiros
 10th Overall Volta a Catalunya
1998
 1st Stage 5 Grande Prémio Jornal de Notícias
 2nd Overall Volta a Portugal
 2nd Overall Volta a Portugal
1999
 2nd Road race, National Road Championships
 7th Overall G.P. Portugal Telecom
 8th Overall Tour of Galicia
2000
 10th Overall Volta ao Algarve
2001
 1st Circuito da Malveira
 9th Overall Volta a Portugal
2002
 1st Clássica Alcochete

Grand Tour general classification results timeline

References

1969 births
Living people
Portuguese male cyclists
Cyclists at the 1996 Summer Olympics
Cyclists at the 2000 Summer Olympics
Olympic cyclists of Portugal
Volta a Portugal winners
People from Torres Vedras
Sportspeople from Lisbon District